Oscar Henry Brandon  (9 March 1916 – 20 April 1993) was a Czech-born British journalist employed by The Sunday Times, who worked for most of his career in Washington.

Early life 
Brandon was born in Liberec, then in the Austro-Hungarian Empire, on 9 March 1916 to a banker father whose surname was "Brandeis". He was educated at the University of Prague in Czechoslovakia and the University of Lausanne in Switzerland.

Career 
Brandon moved to London in 1939 and became a freelance contributor to The Sunday Times. He then served within the newspaper in the posts of war correspondent from 1943 to 1945, Paris correspondent from 1945 to 1946, roving diplomatic correspondent from 1947 to 1949, and most notably, chief Washington correspondent from 1950 to 1983. In that role, he built friendships with prominent figures in US politics, including Henry Kissinger and John F. Kennedy. It was ordered by the US president, Richard Nixon, that Brandon's phone be wiretapped in 1969, as, according to the Encyclopædia Britannica, "the extent of his political knowledge was so well known". He was associate editor of The Sunday Times for 20 years, in parallel with his role in Washington, from 1963 to 1983.

After retiring from The Sunday Times, he became a guest scholar in foreign policy studies at the Brookings Institution from 1983 until his death. He also spent time at both The New York Times and The Washington Star as a columnist.

According to his colleague Phillip Knightley, it was "well known among the press pack" that Brandon worked for MI6.

Personal life 
Brandon married the socialite Mabel Hobart Wentworth, better known as Muffie Cabot, in 1970, with whom he had one daughter. His stepdaughter was Ali Wentworth, an actress who married the TV anchor George Stephanopoulos.

Brandon became a naturalised British citizen. He lived in Washington.

Death 
Brandon died at the National Hospital for Neurology and Neurosurgery in Queen Square, in Bloomsbury, on 20 April 1993. Notice of his death, and his cause of death, a stroke, were announced the next day.

Honours 
Brandon was appointed Commander of the Order of British Empire in 1985.

Bibliography

References

External links 

1916 births
1993 deaths
The Sunday Times people
Writers from Liberec
Charles University alumni
University of Lausanne alumni
Commanders of the Order of the British Empire
Journalists from Washington, D.C.
Naturalised citizens of the United Kingdom
Czechoslovak emigrants to the United Kingdom
British expatriates in the United States